The Superior Court of California, County of Nevada, also known as the Nevada County Superior Court or  Nevada Superior Court, is the branch of the California superior court with jurisdiction over Nevada County.

History

Nevada County was partitioned from Yuba County in 1851. Thomas H. Caswell was elected the first County Judge in May 1851 and Nevada City was named the county seat. The first courthouse was a log building completed in 1851 on Broad Street.

In its early years, Nevada City was regularly swept by fires, including March 1851, September 1852, November 1854, and February 1855; a particularly disastrous fire, fanned by winds on July 19, 1856, destroyed most of the city, including the first county courthouse. A second courthouse was built in 1856 as a two-story granite and brick building in the Greek Revival style; it occupied the block bounded by Church, Pine, Washington, and Main overlooking the city's retail district on Broad. It was saved from destruction in the fire of May 23, 1858, by wet blankets and bucket brigades; however, another disastrous fire on November 8, 1863, destroyed the second courthouse. Some of the bricks were reused in the city's Masonic Hall.

The third courthouse was built on the same site in 1864. The 1864 courthouse was remodeled in 1900 to add a third storey. In 1937, it underwent a more thorough remodeling under the guidance of architect George C. Sellon, funded by the Works Progress Administration and gaining an Art Deco / Streamline Moderne facade. An annex was added in 1964, designed by Mau & Barnum to expand County office space and the jail.

Venues

A planning study was completed in June 2022 to examine options to bring the Nevada City courthouse into compliance, including remodeling the existing complex or building a new courthouse, either at the existing site or at a new site near the County Government Center in Nevada City. The judges of the Nevada County Superior Court expressed their support for option 2, which would be a new building at the existing site.

The branch in Truckee handles all judicial affairs for the eastern part of the county except juvenile justice.

References

External links
 
 

Superior Court
Superior courts in California